Anthony Bale is an English medievalist.

Biography
He is Professor of Medieval Studies at Birkbeck, University of London and from 2017 to 2021 was Executive Dean of the School of Arts, and has written widely on medieval Christian-Jewish relations and on medieval culture and literature. He was awarded a Philip Leverhulme Prize 2011, a prize "awarded to outstanding scholars under the age of 36 who have made a substantial contribution to their field of study, are recognised at an international level, and whose future contributions are held to be of correspondingly high promise." He has published Feeling Persecuted: Christians, Jews and Images of Violence in the Middle Ages, which was awarded the Beatrice White Prize of the English Association. He has published new editions of The Book of Marvels and Travels by Sir John Mandeville and The Book of Margery Kempe. Most recently, he co-edited (with Sebastian Sobecki) Medieval English Travel: A Critical Anthology, and was Morton W. Bloomfield Fellow at Harvard University. His biography of Margery Kempe, entitled Margery Kempe: A Mixed Life, appeared in 2021. Anthony Bale was President of the New Chaucer Society from 2020 to 2022.

His ‘’Travel Guide to the Middle Ages'’ will be published by Viking Penguin in 2023.

References

Academics of Birkbeck, University of London
Living people
English historians
1975 births